Eastminster was an iron full-rigged ship built in Port Glasgow, Scotland, in 1876. She operated as an emigrant vessel.

Eastminster was last seen departing Maryborough, Queensland, Australia, after ignoring a warning from the harbor pilot, heading out to sea in a rising gale on 17 February 1888, bound for Newcastle, New South Wales, Australia. Eastminster was presumed lost during a tropical cyclone that passed through the area immediately afterward.

References

External links
The Sailing ship Eastminster 1876-1888 & Captain Daniel Rowland Rees 1836-1888, by Ivor Davies
Mysteries of Old Ocean, the Ship Eastminster That Disappeared in Queensland Waters, Cairns Post, 26 September 1939
The Sailing Ship Eastminster, wrecked on Half Mast Island, Bunker Group. The Courier Mail, Brisbane, Queensland, 26 September 1934

Individual sailing vessels
Ships built on the River Clyde
Shipwrecks of Queensland
Shipwrecks in the Coral Sea
Maritime incidents in February 1888
Ships lost with all hands
1876 ships
1888 in Australia
1871–1900 ships of Australia
Full-rigged ships of Australia
1876 in Scotland
Sailing ships of Scotland